is a retired Japanese long-distance runner and Olympic gold medal-winning marathoner. She won the gold medal in the marathon at the 2000 Sydney Olympics and became the first woman to complete a marathon in under 2:20:00 in 2001.

Biography
Takahashi was born in Gifu, Gifu Prefecture on May 6, 1972, the eldest daughter of educator Yoshiaki Takahashi and his wife Shigeko. Her father was a kindergarten principal. She is a second cousin-niece of chemist and Nobel Prize laureate Hideki Shirakawa.

She started running track in junior high school, and placed second in the 1500 meter and third in the 3000 meter races at the Japanese national collegiate championships while attending Osaka Gakuin University. Following graduation, she sought out the prominent distance running coach   and began training under him. She supplemented her training regimen in Japan with altitude training in Colorado. 

In March 1998, running in her second marathon, Takahashi set a Japanese women's record of 2:25:48 at the Nagoya Women's Marathon. Two months later, she won the 5000 meter race in the Osaka Japan Grand Prix. Later in December of that same year, Takahashi set a new Japanese women's marathon record when she won the  Asian Games marathon in Bangkok with a time of 2:21:47 under very warm conditions. 

In March 2000, Takahashi earned a spot on Japan's Olympic women's marathon team after winning the Nagoya Women's Marathon in a time of 2:22:19.  She went on to win the women's marathon at the 2000 Olympic Games in Sydney, with an Olympic record time of 2:23:14.  It remained the fastest women's Olympic marathon until 2012 in London. Following her gold medal victory, Takahashi received the 2000 AIMS Best Marathon Runner Award as well as Japan's People's Honour Award.

At the 2001 Berlin Marathon, Takahashi became the first woman to break the 2 hour 20 minute barrier, finishing in a world record time of 2:19:46. In the women's marathon event (and not counting multiple records set by the same athlete), she still holds the 7th best time and the 3rd best Japanese marathon performance behind Yoko Shibui (2:19:41) and Mizuki Noguchi (2:19:12). The following year, Takahashi won the 2002 Berlin Marathon with a time of 2:21:49.

During her running career, Takahashi suffered from a series of injuries.  She announced her retirement in October 2008.

The Gifu Seiryu Half Marathon was launched in 2011 with the honorary title being the Naoko Takahashi Cup. Takahashi serves as the chairwoman for the race.

Since her retirement from competitive running, Takahashi has also worked as a sportscaster, marathon commentator, served as a Japanese Olympic Committee (JOC) executive, and served as an executive member of the Japan Association of Athletics Federations (JAAF).

Takahashi is related to former Morning Musume leader Hitomi Yoshizawa.

Achievements
 2000 Olympic Games - gold medal
 2001 Berlin Marathon - world record

References

External links

 
 Takahashi taking life in stride 01-09-2003 http://www.japantimes.co.jp/sports/2003/01/09/more-sports/takahashi-taking-life-in-stride/
 Takahashi setting sights on another Olympic gold in 2004 01-10-2003 http://www.japantimes.co.jp/sports/2003/01/10/more-sports/takahashi-setting-sights-on-another-olympic-gold-in-2004/

1972 births
Living people
People from Gifu
Japanese female long-distance runners
Japanese female marathon runners
Olympic female marathon runners
Olympic athletes of Japan
Olympic gold medalists for Japan
Olympic gold medalists in athletics (track and field)
Athletes (track and field) at the 2000 Summer Olympics
Medalists at the 2000 Summer Olympics
Asian Games gold medalists for Japan
Asian Games medalists in athletics (track and field)
Asian Games gold medalists in athletics (track and field)
Athletes (track and field) at the 1998 Asian Games
Medalists at the 1998 Asian Games
World Athletics Championships athletes for Japan
Japan Championships in Athletics winners
People's Honour Award winners
Recipients of the Association of International Marathons and Distance Races Best Marathon Runner Award
Sportspeople from Gifu Prefecture
Berlin Marathon female winners
World record setters in athletics (track and field)